Firingoti (Assamese: ফিৰিঙতি) is a 1992 Indian Assamese language film directed by Jahnu Barua. The film was released in 1992.

Plot
The story is set in 1962, during the Sino-Indian War. It revolves around Ritu, widowed teacher, who transferred to Koronga, a small Assamese village. 

The school there was destroyed by fire ten years earlier. Ritu takes on the challenge of rebuilding the school. Ritu builds a school. It starts functioning under a large tree. 

A supposed 'son of the soil' wants to take over the school after losing his job there. When Ritu fights back against his threats and physical assault, the man brings his ruffian friends and sets fire to the school. She is comforted by the promise of the inhabitants to reconstruct the school.

Awards
National Film Award – Second Best Feature Film
National Film Award - Best Actress : Moloya Goswami

See also
Jollywood Assamese

References

External links
 

Films featuring a Best Actress National Award-winning performance
1992 films
Films set in Assam
Second Best Feature Film National Film Award winners
Films directed by Jahnu Barua
1990s Assamese-language films